Temple Bar may refer to:

 Temple Bar, London, a place in London marking the boundary of the Cities of London and Westminister
Temple Bar Gate, designed by Christopher Wren and since dismantled and moved to Paternoster Square.
Temple Bar Memorial, unveiled in 1880 
 Temple Bar, Dublin, a cultural quarter in Dublin
 Temple Bar TradFest, a traditional Irish music and cultural festival at the location above
 Temple Bar Gallery and Studios, at the location above
 Temple Bar, Lake Mead, a site on the Arizona side of Lake Mead 
 Temple Bar Marina, a marina on Lake Mead in the U.S. state of Arizona
 Temple Bar Airport, airport at the location above
 Temple Bar, Ceredigion, a village in Ceredigion, Wales
 Temple Bar (magazine), a British literary magazine published 1860 to 1906
 Mory's or "Mory's Temple Bar", a private club in New Haven, Connecticut near the Yale campus
 Temple Bar, an album by John Waite